The Clare Congregational Church, also known as the Clare Congregational United Church of Christ, is a church located at 110 West Fifth Street in Clare, Michigan.  It was designated a Michigan State Historic Site and listed on the National Register of Historic Places in 1994.

History

The village of Clare was established in 1870−71. The Rev. Austin H. Norris arrived in 1872, and organized the Clare Congregational Church.  The congregation first met in a school house, but in 1873 work was begun on a small frame church, which was completed in 1874.

In 1907, the congregation determined that a new church building was required.  The original church was moved to the rear of the lot, and in 1908 the church commissioned Saginaw architect William T. Cooper to design the new building.  Construction was completed in 1909.

In 1961, the Clare Congregational Church  merged with the United Church of Christ, and the combined congregation was known as the Clare Congregational United Church of Christ. The building was extensively renovated in 1994, and is still used by the congregation.

Description
The Clare Congregational Church is a red brick building with limestone trim on a concrete foundation, built in a cross-shape with an octagonal dome. Each of the four facades features a limestone beltcourse above the high basement, and broad central area containing three windows flanked by shallow piers with limestone trim.  The main entrance to the church is a  small hip roof structure located at one corner.  The central dome is pierced by stained glass windows.  Stained glass in the remainder of the church was originally installed in the earlier 1874 building.

A single-story addition was constructed at the rear of the church in 1958.

The interior consists of a semi-circular sanctuary, decorated with patterns from European-designed stencils.  The church is significant as one of the few in Michigan that reflect the architectural adoption by early twentieth-century Protestants of the Early Christian central plan churches of the 5th and 6th centuries.

References

External links
Clare Congregational United Church of Christ

Churches completed in 1909
Michigan State Historic Sites
United Church of Christ churches in Michigan
Churches on the National Register of Historic Places in Michigan
Buildings and structures in Clare County, Michigan
National Register of Historic Places in Clare County, Michigan